AIAI or Aiai may refer to:

 Artificial Intelligence Applications Institute, a non-profit technology transfer organisation at the University of Edinburgh, 1983-2019
 Artificial Intelligence and its Applications Institute, a research institute in the School of Informatics at the University of Edinburgh, 2019-
 al-Itihaad al-Islamiya, a Somali Islamist group
 AiAi, a character in the video game Super Monkey Ball

See also
 AIA (disambiguation)
 AI (disambiguation)
 Aye-aye, a species of lemur

Film
 Aye-Aye (2002)